17th Nova Scotia general election may refer to:

Nova Scotia general election, 1843, the 17th general election to take place in the Colony of Nova Scotia, for the 17th General Assembly of Nova Scotia
1933 Nova Scotia general election, the 39th overall general election for Nova Scotia, for the (due to a counting error in 1859) 40th Legislative Assembly of Nova Scotia, but considered the 17th general election for the Canadian province of Nova Scotia.